The 1950 John Carroll Blue Streaks football team was an American football team that represented John Carroll University as an independent during the 1950 college football season. The team compiled an 8–2 record and outscored opponents by a total of 322 to 127.  Herb "Skeeter" Eisele was the team's head coach for the fourth year. 

Senior Don Shula played at the halfback position. Shula later spent more than 40 years in the National Football League (NFL) as a player and coach and was inducted into the Pro Football Hall of Fame.  John Carroll's football stadium is named Don Shula Stadium in his honor.

Fullback Carl Taseff received Little All-America honors from the Associated Press (AP) and was also selected by the AP as the captain of the All-Ohio football team. Taseff later played in the NFL and was an assistant coach under Shula with the Miami Dolphins.

Schedule

References

John Carroll
John Carroll Blue Streaks football seasons
John Carroll Blue Streaks football